Neelay Hath is a 1989 Pakistani television series written by Shahid Nadeem and directed by Muhammd Azeem. The drama was aired during Benazir Bhutto's government. The series also got popular in India.

Synopsis 
The stroy revolves around Nabila Nauman an educated girl and also a member of an organization for women's equal rights. She is imprisoned on false charges and she meets three prisoners who are incarcerated on various false charges

Cast 
 Madeeha Gauhar as Nabila Noman
 Uzma Gillani as Zulekha
 Saba Hameed as Parveen
 Roohi Bano as Zainab
 Bushra Ansari as Jameela
 Arifa Siddiqui as Sakeena
 Bindiya as Sajida Hameed
 Faryal Gohar as Zarmeen
 Khayyam Sarhadi as Rashid
 Talat Siddiqui as Sakeena's Mother
 Mehboob Alam as Jeevan
 Irsa Ghazal as Rano
 Naima Khan as Bari Phuppo
 Nirvaan Nadeem as Jameela's son
 Asim Bukhari as Noman Siddiqui
 Fareeha Jabeen as Police Woman
 Tani Begum as Rani
 Mehmood Aslam as Manzoor
 Jazba Sultan as Ruqayya
 Mansoor Baloch as Kamran
 Jameel Fakhri as Khanu
 Haseeb Pasha as Jilani
 Uzra Butt as Mai Jee
 Kanwal as Amna
 Ismat Tahira  as Sudhi
 Tauqeer Nisar as Murad
 Tasneem Kausar as Nazeer Bibi
 Najma Begum as Clothing Supervisor in Jail
 Altaf ur Rehman  as Parveen's Father
 Khalida Arjumand as Sajida's Mother
 Aurangzeb Laghari as Abdul Kareem
 Yusaf Ali as Rehmat
 Jevan Sultan as Deputy
 Sikandar Shaheen as I.G
 Khalid Butt as Muhammad Deen
 Mehwish Apa as Prisoner
 Roohi Khan as Zeenat Ara
 Basit Khan as Rizwan
 Parvez Raza as Mukhtar
 Munir Nadir as Chaudhry Bichoo
 Inam Khan as Anwar
 Hamid Mehmood as Lal Deen
 Noman Shah as Adil
 Salma Khan as Shehzadi
 Tahira Saleem as Mrs Tauqeer
 Veena Khan as Hajra

Production 
The series was based on Barri (The Acquittal) written by Shahid Nadeem stage play based on four female prisoners incarcerated on various false charges. It gained critical acclaim in both Pakistan and India and then Shahid wrote the television serial called Neelay Hath.

References

External links 
 

1980s Pakistani television series
Pakistan Television Corporation original programming
Pakistani drama television series
Urdu-language television shows